Scarp Mountain is located on the border of Alberta and British Columbia, at the southern end of Mount Robson Provincial Park. It was named in 1922 by Arthur O. Wheeler.

See also
 List of peaks on the British Columbia–Alberta border

References

Three-thousanders of Alberta
Three-thousanders of British Columbia
Canadian Rockies
Mountains of Jasper National Park
Mount Robson Provincial Park